"Broken Down Heart" was the a song with the dubious distinction of first being on the A-side, and then subsequently flipped to the B-side of a 45 rpm record by the band Arrows in 1975. On the other side of this vinyl single record was the first released version of a song that has gone on to become an internationally known rock standard, the anthemic sing-along, "I Love Rock 'N Roll."
A medium tempo song, Broken Down Heart was written by Roger Ferris, produced by Mickie Most on RAK Records , and sung by Arrows lead vocalist Alan Merrill. The record was a follow up to a top 30 UK chart hit by Arrows titled My Last Night With You, also written by Roger Ferris.
John Bundrick played piano on "Broken Down Heart," Chris Spedding played the guitar, and drums were by Clem Cattini. The only Arrows band member actually contributing on "Broken Down Heart" was lead singer Alan Merrill, who also played bass on the track.

External links
 
 The song's history

Arrows (British band) songs
1975 songs
Song recordings produced by Mickie Most
Songs written by Roger Ferris
RAK Records singles